Alberto Della Beffa (August 24, 1914 – August 12, 1969) was an Italian bobsledder who competed in the early 1950s. At the 1952 Winter Olympics, he finished tenth both in the two-man event and in the four-man event.

References
1952 bobsleigh two-man results
1952 bobsleigh four-man results
Unione Nazionale Veterani dello Sport 
Alberto Della Beffa's profile at Sports Reference.com

1914 births
1969 deaths
Italian male bobsledders
Olympic bobsledders of Italy
Bobsledders at the 1952 Winter Olympics
Victims of aviation accidents or incidents in Switzerland